The arrondissement of Créteil is an arrondissement of France in the Val-de-Marne department in the Île-de-France region. It has 16 communes.

Composition

The communes of the arrondissement of Créteil, and their INSEE codes, are:

 Alfortville (94002)
 Boissy-Saint-Léger (94004)
 Bonneuil-sur-Marne (94011)
 Chennevières-sur-Marne (94019)
 Créteil (94028)
 Limeil-Brévannes (94044)
 Mandres-les-Roses (94047)
 Marolles-en-Brie (94048)
 Périgny (94056)
 Le Plessis-Trévise (94059)
 La Queue-en-Brie (94060)
 Saint-Maur-des-Fossés (94068)
 Saint-Maurice (94069)
 Santeny (94070)
 Sucy-en-Brie (94071)
 Villecresnes (94075)

History

The arrondissement of Créteil was created in 1964 as part of the department Seine. In 1968 it became part of the new department Val-de-Marne. On 25 February 2017, it lost 8 communes to the arrondissement of L'Haÿ-les-Roses, and it lost 2 communes to and gained 3 communes from the arrondissement of Nogent-sur-Marne.

As a result of the reorganisation of the cantons of France which came into effect in 2015, the borders of the cantons are no longer related to the borders of the arrondissements. The cantons of the arrondissement of Créteil were, as of January 2015:

 Alfortville-Nord
 Alfortville-Sud
 Boissy-Saint-Léger
 Bonneuil-sur-Marne
 Charenton-le-Pont
 Choisy-le-Roi
 Créteil-Nord
 Créteil-Ouest
 Créteil-Sud
 Ivry-sur-Seine-Est
 Ivry-sur-Seine-Ouest
 Maisons-Alfort-Nord
 Maisons-Alfort-Sud
 Orly
 Saint-Maur-des-Fossés-Centre
 Saint-Maur-des-Fossés-Ouest
 Saint-Maur-La Varenne
 Sucy-en-Brie
 Valenton
 Villecresnes
 Villeneuve-le-Roi
 Villeneuve-Saint-Georges
 Vitry-sur-Seine-Est
 Vitry-sur-Seine-Nord
 Vitry-sur-Seine-Ouest

References

Creteil